Paignton railway station serves the town and seaside resort of Paignton in Devon, England. The station is the current terminus of the Riviera Line from Exeter and is also an interchange station between National Rail services and the preserved Dartmouth Steam Railway.

History

The railway to Paignton was built by the Dartmouth and Torbay Railway, opening to passengers on 2 August 1859 and extended to Brixham Road station on 14 March 1861.  Goods traffic was handled at Paignton from 1 April 1861. The Dartmouth and Torbay Railway was always operated by the South Devon Railway and was amalgamated with it on 1 January 1872. This was only short lived as the South Devon Railway was in turn amalgamated into the Great Western Railway on 1 February 1876. The single-track line had been built using the  broad gauge, but on 20 May 1892 was converted to  standard gauge.

On 11 July 1904, GWR road motor services started running from here to Torquay, in competition with recently extended Torquay Tramways; the land opposite the station is still used as a bus station.

Further expansion came in 1924 with the opening of a larger booking office and new canopies were erected over the platforms. A few years later the double track was extended to Goodrington, new carriage sidings opened behind the southbound platform. A new goods shed opened on 1 June 1931 south of the station, which freed the original goods shed to deal with parcels traffic and passengers' luggage, and allowed the platforms to be further extended. Plans in 1937 to move the station onto a new site south near the goods shed, which would have allowed five platforms to be constructed, failed to materialise due to World War II.

The Great Western Railway was nationalised into British Railways in 1948.  In 1956 further carriage sidings were opened at Goodrington, mainly used to handle the heavy traffic on summer Saturdays.

The line from Paignton to Kingswear was sold to the Dart Valley Light Railway plc on 30 December 1972, which operated another nearby heritage railway at Buckfastleigh. An independent station alongside the main platform, known as "Queens Park", was opened to serve the Kingswear trains on the site of the carriage sidings opened in 1930.  This site includes a shed for the railway's operational engines and carriages. The line has since been transferred to the Dartmouth Steam Railway.

Location 

The station is sandwiched between two level crossings. At the north (Torquay) end of the station is the busy crossing over Torbay Road. It has a footbridge to allow people to cross the line on foot when the crossing is closed for a train to pass. At the opposite end is the quieter Sands Road crossing, which is used when trains are running on to the carriage sidings or when the heritage line to Kingswear is in operation. Because of this the two lines over this crossing are operated as single tracks with trains running in either direction on both. Both platforms have step-free access; passengers unable to use the footbridge are able to pass from one platform to the other over the Torbay Road level crossing at the north end of the platforms.

Platform layout 
Most trains both arrive and depart from this platform (number 2). If a train is not returning immediately towards Newton Abbot it may arrive at platform 1 and continue over Sands Road Level Crossing into the carriage sidings, returning later to Platform 2. This is because there is no crossover which allows passenger trains to start northwards from Platform 1. It is possible for short trains to shunt out of platform 1 towards Newton Abbot and return to platform 2 when it is vacant.

The Dartmouth Steam Railway has its own independent platform and entrance on the south side of the station. Their locomotives are coaled in the shunting neck adjacent to the approach road but the shed is at the far end of the station.

Services 

Paignton is served by Great Western Railway local trains on an approximately half-hourly basis during the day Monday to Friday. Most trains run to and from Exmouth; on Sundays the service is less frequent. A few long-distance trains also run to/from Paignton. These include Great Western Railway services to London Paddington station and CrossCountry services to Manchester Piccadilly. The Dartmouth Steam Railway also operate services to Kingswear railway station, every day between April and November, as well as some additional running outside of this.

Former services 
From the mid 1990s until December 2009 South West Trains operated up to three return trains to/from London Waterloo (as extensions of their West of England Main Line trains to Exeter St Davids) daily. These were withdrawn at the December 2009 timetable change.

Signalling 
Two signal boxes were opened in 1889, the 13-lever North Signal Box beside the Torbay Road level crossing, the 17-lever South Signal Box by the Sands Road level crossing. Both were replaced in 1924 by two new boxes.  The North box closed on 26 March 1988 when control of trains was transferred to the Panel Signal Box at Exeter but the South box was retained to monitor the two level crossings. In 1990 this function was transferred to a panel in the station buildings and the signal box closed.

References

Bibliography

Railway stations in Devon
Heritage railway stations in Devon
Railway stations in Great Britain opened in 1859
Former Great Western Railway stations
Railway stations served by Great Western Railway
Railway stations served by CrossCountry
Buildings and structures in Paignton
DfT Category C2 stations